Ask Any Girl may refer to:

Ask Any Girl (film), a 1959 film starring Shirley MacLaine
"Ask Any Girl", a song by The Supremes